Meer may refer to:

Fatima Meer (1928–2010), South African writer and anti-apartheid activist
Johnny Vander Meer (1914–1997), American baseball pitcher, famed for pitching two consecutive no-hitters
Mark Meer, Canadian actor and writer
, South African journalist and newspaper editor of The Indian Views
Simon van der Meer (1925–2011), Dutch accelerator physicist
Mir Taqi Mir (1722–1810), Urdu poet
Mir (band), Canadian rock band, pronounced "meer"
Meer Campbell, fictional character from the anime series Mobile Suit Gundam SEED
Meer, character in the Deverry Cycle book series

Places 
Meer, Antwerp, Belgium
Meer, Belgian Limburg, Belgium
Meer, Flemish Brabant, Belgium
Meer, North Brabant in the Netherlands
Meer, Overijssel in the Netherlands
Meer, Beytüşşebap, village in Turkey
 Alternatively, "meer" is the Dutch word for "lake", e.g. Markermeer.

See also
Mir (disambiguation)
Van der Meer